The Pomeranian Library, in full Stanisław Staszic Pomeranian Library (Polish: Książnica Pomorska im. Stanisława Staszica) is a Regional Library based in Szczecin (formerly Stettin), Poland. It is  the largest humanities oriented library in West Pomerania, with a focus on social sciences, Pomeranian, Scandinavian and German subjects and Seamanship. The library possesses also general scientific reading room with books from other fields of science, including mathematics, natural and medical sciences.

German stage of the history
It was decided to establish a public library in 1901, and material was acquired from the Council Library, the library of the Pomeranian Museum and in 1904 the city school library. The library itself was opened 3 October 1905, and material has been acquired from various sources subsequently.

Polish stage of the history

On July 12, 1945, the City Library in Szczecin, resumed its activities as the first Polish library in the city destroyed during the Second World War. Systematic removal of the effects of war and ordering of the collections were undergone from the first months after the end of the war.

Ownership was transferred from central to local government in 1990. Książnica organizes scientific meetings, among others on the history of Pomerania, and exhibitions with artistic works and presentations on the history of books in the region of Szczecin and entire Pomerania. Recent projects have included microfilming the most valuable documents.

The library has about 300,000 registered readers.

The English name of 'Książnica' in catalogue (database) http://www.worldcat.org is 'Central Library of the West Pomeranian Province'.

References

External links
The website is www.ksiaznica.szczecin.pl (in Polish).

Literature
 Bernhard Fabian, Marzena Zacharska, Todorka Nikolova: Handbuch deutscher historischer Buchbestände in Europa. Polen und Bulgarien. Georg Olms Verlag, Hildesheim 1999, S. 165f.
 Książnica Pomorska im. Stanisława Staszica w Szczecinie (Hrsg.): Schätze der Pommerschen Bibliothek Szczezin, 4. veränderte Auflage, Szczecin, Poland (2010), 
Stephanie Funk: Östlich der Oder: Polen und sein Bibliothekswesen. In: LIBREAS. Library Ideas 04/2006.

Libraries in Poland
Libraries established in 1901